John E. Frank (born April 17, 1962) is a hair restoration surgeon, former professional athlete and bobsledder.  He played college football as a tight end at Ohio State University, and professionally in the National Football League (NFL) with the San Francisco 49ers from 1984 to 1988.  Frank was selected by the 49ers in the second round of the 1984 NFL Draft, and won two Super Bowls with the team.

Early years

John Frank was born in Pittsburgh, Pennsylvania the son of Barbara (née Sheck) and Alan Frank, and is Jewish. He graduated from Mt Lebanon High School in 1980.  During high school, he volunteered in the surgical laboratory of Dr Thomas Starzl, the "Father of Modern Transplantation", part of a team that performed the world's first liver transplant.

Ohio State University

While at Ohio State, John Frank was the starting tight end from 1981 to 83 and caught more passes than any other tight end in the history of the school. He was honored as a two-time Academic All-American, became the team's most valuable player, and was selected as a member of the All Century Ohio State Football Team and Ohio State's Varsity Hall of Fame.

As an undergraduate, he co-authored several research papers investigating the best treatments for pediatric croup and the work was published in the Laryngoscope.

While finishing at Ohio State, he was invited to attend the Combine in Indianapolis in 1984, but declined in order to continue studying for his final exams. He was drafted in the second round of the NFL draft by the San Francisco Forty Niners and in June 1984 he graduated with a Bachelor of Arts in chemistry from Ohio State.

College statistics
1980: 5 catches for 65 yards.
1981: 45 catches for 449 yards and 3 TD.
1982: 26 catches for 326 yards and 2 TD.
1983: 45 catches for 641 yards and 4 TD.

Medical school
Frank had already been accepted into several medical schools, but decided to enroll at Ohio State University College of Medicine because they had an independent study program which allowed flexibility to continue playing in the NFL while completing the first year of medical school. They also offered a deferred enrollment into medical school, but Frank chose to attend medical school during the NFL off-seasons.

During medical school, he continued researching diseases of the head and neck and microvascular surgery and the Gait Analysis laboratory.

NFL career
Frank was selected in the second round of the 1984 NFL draft by the San Francisco 49ers. During his first season, he played as a reserve tight end behind Russ Francis, and as a specialist, while the team went 18–1 as they defeated the Miami Dolphins in Super Bowl XIX. He injured his left elbow during the NFC Championship victory over the Chicago Bears, and therefore saw limited time in Super Bowl XIX.

During his five-year career, he caught 65 passes for 662 yards and became the starting tight end during his fourth and fifth seasons.  In Super Bowl XXIII he caught two passes, including a key pass thrown by Joe Montana during the winning touchdown drive.

Following the game and during what was considered to be the height of his professional football career, he announced his retirement to devote himself full-time to medical school. The vacated tight end position was filled by future All-Pro tight end Brent Jones in 1989. The Forty Niners also drafted Wesley Walls in the second round of the 1989 draft.

After the NFL
After retiring from football, Frank earned his M.D. from Ohio State in 1992.  He is an otolaryngologist, board-certified by the American Board of Otolaryngology and the American Board Of Hair Restoration Surgery. He became a Fellow of the American College of Surgeons, an Assistant Professor of Clinical Otolarygology at Columbia University College of Physicians and Surgeons and The Ohio State University College of Medicine-adjunct. He has performed over 2,500 hair transplant procedures in New York, California and Ohio. In 2006 he opened Anapelli Hair Clinic in New York City, specializing in surgical hair transplantation as well as biocapillation.
His practices in New York City and Central Ohio are dedicated exclusively to hair restoration.

See also
List of select Jewish football players
 Colin Allred - former NFL linebacker who became a lawyer and US Representative
 Tommy Casanova - former NFL player who became an ophthalmologist
 Dennis Claridge – former NFL quarterback who became an orthodontist
 Dan Doornink – former NFL running back who became a medical doctor
 Laurent Duvernay-Tardif – current NFL player who earned a medical degree while playing in the league
 Joel Makovicka – former NFL fullback who became a doctor of physical therapy
 Bill McColl - former NFL player who became an orthopedic surgeon, father of Milt McColl
 Milt McColl - former NFL linebacker who became a medical doctor
 Frank Ryan – former NFL player and mathematician, who maintained an academic career while playing in the league
 Myron Rolle – former NFL defensive back who was also a Rhodes scholar and is now serving a neurosurgery residency
 John Urschel – former NFL player and mathematician who was a PhD candidate while playing in the league
 Byron White - former NFL running back who became a US Supreme Court Justice
 Rob Zatechka – former NFL guard who became a medical doctor

References

External links
 
 

1962 births
Living people
American football tight ends
Ohio State Buckeyes football players
San Francisco 49ers players
Sportspeople from Mt. Lebanon, Pennsylvania
Players of American football from Pennsylvania
Ohio State University College of Medicine alumni
Jewish American sportspeople
21st-century American Jews